Salla Jipiña (Aymara salla rocks, cliffs, jipiña squatting of animals, also spelled Salla Jipina) is a  mountain in the Cordillera Real in the Bolivian Andes. It lies in the La Paz Department, Murillo Province, La Paz Municipality. Salla Jipiña is situated south-east of the mountains Ch'iyar Qirini and Chacaltaya.

References 

Mountains of La Paz Department (Bolivia)